Richard Newman Harding Newman (1756 or 1757 – 1808), born Richard Newman Harding, was an English landowner and cricketer who was the absentee landlord of a Jamaican slave plantation. He was considered a renowned huntsman and was the subject of a portrait by George Romney.

Life and family
Harding Newman was born in 1756 or 1757, the oldest son of Benjamin Harding and his wife Sarah (née Newman). The family lived at Hacton House close to Hornchurch in Essex, but he was baptised at Croydon in Surrey in May 1757. Benjamin Harding owned  of land in Hanover Parish on Jamaica, made up of two plantations at Blue Hole and Newman Hall which produced sugar, rum and molasses. Harding Newman inherited a third-share in the estates alongside his brothers John and Benjamin, following their father's death in 1766. The estates were valued at over £12,000, with more than £10,000 of that value the 198 enslaved people owned by the plantations. He retained ownership of the Blue Hole estate with John until his death. One of Harding Newman's sisters, Sarah Harding, married Robert Charles Dallas, a Jamaican-born poet and writer. Their son was the writer and clergyman Alexander Dallas.

In 1766, Harding Newman's maternal grandfather Richard Newman died, leaving property in Essex, including land at West Ham Abbey, to him. As a condition of the will he added the surname Newman to his name in 1783, although it appears that in later life he reverted to Harding as his primary surname. He owned other property in the county, including at Romford, and in 1781 purchased land at Nelmes near to Hornchurch.

Harding Newman married twice. He married his first wife Harriet Schütz at Westminster in 1776 aged 17. Harriet was the daughter of Francis Schütz of Gillingham Hall in Norfolk, the third-cousin of Frederick, Prince of Wales. The marriage produced two surviving sons, Thomas Harding Newman and Benjamin Newman Harding. Following Harriet's death Harding Newman married his second wife, Rosamond Bradish, in 1806; the marriage produce a further two children before his death two years later.

A renowned huntsman and considered a fine sportsman, Harding Newman was, according to obituaries, well known in "agricultural circles" and was considered a philanthropist. He served as a Justice of the Peace and was commissioned in the Loyal Havering Volunteer Cavalry, serving as the commanding officer of the troop, an Essex Yeomanry unit of provisional cavalry. As well as his estates in Essex, he had inherited land at Black Callerton in Northumberland and at Great Clacton in Essex through the Schütz family.

Harding Newman died at Tempsford in Bedfordshire in 1808 aged 51. His son, Thomas, inherited his Essex estates as well as the slave estates in Jamaica; when he remarried in 1818 Thomas' second wife, Eliza Hall, may have received The Rice portrait, possibly of a young Jane Austen, as a wedding present. Nelmes House was later owned by Thomas' son, also named Thomas, who was a clergyman and fellow of Magdalen College, Oxford. Harding Newman's other son Benjamin served in the British Army, rising to the rank of lieutenant colonel.

Portrait

In around 1770 or 1771, Harding Newman was the subject of a portrait by George Romney at a time when the artist was coming to prominence as one of the leading portrait artists in London. It depicts Harding Newman with a hunting dog and dressed in pink. The painting remained in the family until 1890 and was later owned by Alfred de Rothschild and then by Michael Arthur Bass. It was sold in 2014 at Christie's for £194,500 and is considered "a characteristic work of the period" which displays "bravura brushwork [which] is combined with passages of masterfully subtle observation".

The picture has sometimes been called The Pink Boy, drawing comparisons to Thomas Gainsborough's portrait The Blue Boy. Whilst Bass owned the portrait it was hung at Chesterfield House in Mayfair, close to where The Blue Boy was hung at Grosvenor House.

Cricket
Harding Newman is known to have played cricket between 1773 and 1793. He played in 19 matches which are now considered to have first-class cricket status, playing his first known matches in 1773 for a Kent side against one from Surrey. Most of his known cricket was played after 1785. He played matches for the White Conduit Club and then for Marylebone Cricket Club (MCC) following it's foundation in 1787, and for Hornchurch Cricket Club and early Essex sides. He was an early member of MCC and scored the first half century at Lord's Old Ground while playing for an Essex XI in the ground's first known match in 1787.

Harding Newman played 11 first-class matches in 1793, the final year in which he appears on scorecards. His final match was for a side he organised himself against one put together by Richard Leigh, played at Navestock Side in Essex. This is the only match known to have been played on the ground at Navestock which has been awarded first-class status.

Notes

References 

English cricketers
Essex cricketers
Kent cricketers
English cricketers of 1701 to 1786
Marylebone Cricket Club cricketers
White Conduit Club cricketers
English cricketers of 1787 to 1825
Hornchurch Cricket Club cricketers